Orr Peak is a peak in the Miller Range overlooking Marsh Glacier, forming the eastern salient in the bluffs southward of Argo Glacier. Observed in December 1957 by the New Zealand Southern Party of the Commonwealth Trans-Antarctic Expedition (1956–58). Named for H. Orr, IGY scientist at Scott Base in 1957.

Mountains of the Ross Dependency
Shackleton Coast